Selika Lazevski was a black horsewoman in Belle Époque Paris. In 1891, she was the subject of a series of six photographic portraits taken at the studio of Paul Nadar in Paris.

Life
Little is known of her life but she is thought to have been a horsewoman who rode haute école at the Nouveau Cirque (1886-1926) on rue Saint-Honoré, Paris. Selika may not have been her real first name and there is a possibility that she took her surname Lazevski from the Polish circus horseman and haute école rider Valli de Laszewski and his French wife, Lara, who worked at the Nouveau Cirque during that period.

In 1891, Lazevski was the subject of a series of six photographic portraits taken at the studio of Paul Nadar (son of the better known Félix Nadar) in Paris.

L'Africaine
Sélika is the name of an enslaved Hindu princess who is the heroine of L'Africaine, an opera by Giacomo Meyerbeer that was unfinished at the time of his death in 1864. The opera was completed by Meyerbeer's friend, François-Joseph Fétis, and premiered in Paris in 1865 by which time the heroine had become an African princess.

Legacy
In 2016, it was announced that a short film, The Adventures of Selika would be made based on Lazevski's life. The film was made in 2017 and starred Karidja Touré.

References

External links 

https://bfequestrian.wordpress.com/2013/09/24/selikalazevski/
https://susannaforrest.wordpress.com/2018/02/14/everything-i-dont-know-about-selika-lazevski/
Photographs in Mémoire database

French female equestrians
19th-century circus performers
French circus performers
Year of birth unknown
Year of death unknown
Nationality missing
19th-century sportswomen
19th-century French women